Fair Haven is an unincorporated community in Vernon County, in the U.S. state of Missouri.

History
Fair Haven was originally called "Connely's Springs", and under the latter name was platted in 1881 by J. W. Connely, and named for him.  A post office called Connely was established in 1886, the name was changed to Fairhaven in 1890, and the post office closed in 1908. The present name is after the Fair Haven mineral spa near the original town site. A variant name was "Fair Haven Springs".

References

Unincorporated communities in Vernon County, Missouri
Unincorporated communities in Missouri